WAPD may refer to:

 WAPD (FM), a radio station (91.7 FM) licensed to serve Campbellsville, Kentucky, United States
 Dobo Airport, Indonesia (ICAO code WAPD)